The Thakur family (also spelled as Tagore), with over three hundred years of history, has been one of the leading families of Calcutta, India, and is regarded as one of the key influencers during the Bengali Renaissance. The family has produced several persons who have contributed substantially in the fields of business, social and religious reformation, literature, art and music.

Family history 
The original surname of the Tagores was Kushari. They were Pirali Brahmin ('Pirali’ historically carried a stigmatized and pejorative connotation) and originally belonged to a village named Kush in the district named Burdwan in West Bengal. The biographer of Rabindranath Tagore, Prabhat Kumar Mukhopadhyaya wrote in the first volume of his book Rabindrajibani O Rabindra Sahitya Prabeshika that "The Kusharis were the descendants of Deen Kushari, the son of Bhatta Narayana; Deen was granted a village named Kush (in Burdwan zilla) by Maharaja Kshitisura, he became its chief and came to be known as Kushari."

Background of Tagore
Tagores are Bengali Brahmins Rabindranath's biographer, Prabhat Kumar Mukhopadhyaya, wrote in his book named Rabindrajibani O Rabindra Sahitya Prabeshika that: The Kusharis were the descendants of Deen Kushari, the son of Bhatta Narayana; Deen was granted a village named Kush (in Burdwan Zilla) by Maharaja Kshitisura, he became its chief and came to be known as Kushari.On the edges of time (New ed.) (December 1978), Tagore, Rathindranath, Greenwood Press. p. 2, Rabindranath Tagore : Poet And Dramatist(1948), Thompson, Edward, Oxford University Press. p. 13 Generations later a branch of the Tagore family left its ancestral village in Burdwan and moved to the Eastern part of Bengal . Later on their descendants came back to the Western part of Bengal (now West Bengal) from eastern part of Bengal (now Bangladesh) and settled in the region situated on the right bank of the River Hooghly (Rarh) in the 18th century Panchanan Kushari from Dakshindihi (now in Bangladesh), first settled in Gobindapur region around 1720 near what became Fort William, and then after eviction by the British, moved to Jorasanko region south of Sutanuti).

Europeans started coming to Bengal in the 16th century, resulting in the founding of Ugulim (Hooghly-Chinsura) by the Portuguese in 1579. The Battle of Plassey in 1757 resulted in the deposition of the last independent Nawab of Bengal. After the Battle of Buxar, the East India Company was given the right to collect revenues from Bengal. By 1793, the British East India Company had abolished the Nizamat (the office of nizam, the local ruler) and had taken control of the former Mughal province of Bengal.

The Bengal renaissance of the 19th century was a remarkable period of societal transformation in which a whole range of creative activities – literary, cultural, social and economic – flourished. The Bengal Renaissance was the culmination of the process of emergence of the cultural characteristics of the Bengali people that had started in the age of Hussein Shah (1493–1519). This spread over, covering around three centuries, and had a tremendous impact on Bengali society. Incidentally, that coincided with the rise of the Tagore family. The Tagore family attained prominence during this period through its unusual social positioning between Indian and European influences.

The Pathuriaghata family
 

Sir Prodyot Coomar Tagore (1873–1942), son of Jatindramohun Tagore, was a leading philanthropist, art collector, and photographer. He was the first Indian member of the Royal Photographic Society. He was also the Sheriff of Calcutta for the year 1909.

The Jorasanko family

The business base
“The fame of the Jorasanko Tagores stems from the time of Dwarakanath Tagore (1794-1846).” Dwarkanath was the son of Nilmoni Tagore’s second son Rammani Tagore but was adopted by the childless first son RamlochanTagore. He inherited the Jorasanko property and Ramlochan's vast wealth. Dwarakanath was involved in multifarious activities ranging from being an agent of Mackintosh & Co. to being a serestadar, collector and diwan in the 24 Parganas collectorate. However, it was his business prowess that brought him both wealth and fame. In partnership with William Carr, he established Carr, Tagore and Company, the first equal partnership between European and Indian businessmen and the initiator of the managing agency system in India.

Spiritual pursuits

Creative outpourings
Debendranath's third son, Hemendranath Tagore was a strict disciplinarian who was entrusted with the responsibility of looking after the education of his younger brothers as well as administrating the large family estates. Like most of Debendranath's children, he had varied interests in different fields. On one hand, he composed a number of "Bromhosangeets" and on the other, wrote articles on physical science which he planned to compile and edit into a textbook for school students. If his untimely death had not prevented him from completing the project, this would certainly have been the first science textbook to be written in Bengali. He was known for his physical strength and wrestling skills. Exceptionally for the times, he insisted on formal education for his daughters. He not only put them through school but trained them in music, arts and European languages such as French and German. It was another mark of his forward thinking that he actively sought out eligible grooms from different provinces of India for his daughters and married them off in places as far away as Uttar Pradesh and Assam.

Rabindranath Tagore (1861–1941), was Debendranath's penultimate son. He was the first Asian to win a Nobel Prize, and was exceptionally talented and the most famous in the family. Rabindranath is best remembered in history for writing what became the national anthems of the nations of India and Bangladesh and for coining the title Mahatma for Indian nationalist leader Mahatma Gandhi. The youngest son of Debendranath Thakur was Budhendranath, who died at a very young age.

The artists

All these artist Tagore families belong to West Bengal, India.

The younger generation
Rabindranath Tagore's son, Rathindranath (1888-1961) was a multi-talented person. Besides being an agriculturist educated in the US, a talented architect, designer, master-carpenter, painter and writer, was also the first 'upacharya' of Visva-Bharati University. Rathindranath Tagore's wife, Pratima Devi (1893-1969), was an artist associated with Shilpa Sadan, Visva Bharati and also associated with dances and dance drama. 

Sharmila Tagore, a well-known Mumbai actress who is connected with Rabindranath Tagore, in an interview stated that her mother's mother, Latika Tagore was the granddaughter of Rabindranath Tagore's brother, Dwijendranath. Pranati Tagore is a renowned and eminent elocutionist, news reader and Bengali actor. She is married to Sunando Tagore, the great-grandson to Satyendranath Tagore.Pragnasundari Debi, granddaughter of Maharshi Debendranath Tagore, married the most famous Assam author Sahityarathi Laxminath Bezbarua. She was a literary phenomenon in her own right, her cookbook Aamish O Niramish Ahar (1900, reprinted 1995) was a standard given to every Bengali bride with her trousseau, and earning her the appellation "India's Mrs Beeton". Nandita, daughter of Mira Devi, the youngest daughter of Rabindranath Tagore, married Krishna Kripalani, a freedom fighter, author and parliamentarian. His biography of Rabindranath, is amongst the best ever written.

The family environment
The environment at Jorasanko was filled with literature, music, painting, and theatre. They had their own education system. In the earlier days, the women did not go to school but they were all educated at home. Swarnakumari Debi has recalled how in her early days the governess would write something on a slate which the girls then had to copy. When Debedranath discovered this, he at once stopped such a mindless and mechanical method and brought in a better teacher, Ajodhyanath Pakrashi – a male outsider in the women's quarters... Some of the sons like Ganendra, Gunendra and Jyoitrindra set up their own private theatre. To start with men played in the role of women, but over a period of time even the women joined. The environment in the family played a major role in the development of its members. Even Rabindranath Tagore who went to win the Nobel Prize in literature had very little formal education.

Family tree 

 Dwarkanath Tagore
 Girindranath Tagore
 Ganendranath Tagore
 Gunendranath Tagore
 Gaganendranath Tagore
 Kanakendranath Tagore
 Gitindranath Tagore
 Sharmila Tagore, m. Mansoor Ali Khan Pataudi
 Saif Ali Khan, m. Amrita Singh (divorced), m. Kareena Kapoor
 Sara Ali Khan
 Ibrahim Ali Khan Pataudi
 Taimur Ali Khan Pataudi
 Saba Ali Khan
 Soha Ali Khan, m. Kunal Khemu
 Oindrila Tagore
 Romila Sen
 Abanindranath Tagore
 Samarendranath Tagore
 Sunayani Devi, m. Rajanimohan Chattopadhyay
 Binayani Devi, m. Seshendra Bhushan Chattopadhyay
 Pratima Devi
 Debendranath Tagore
 Rabindranath Tagore
 Rathindranath Tagore
 Nandini Devi, m. Giridhari Lala
 Shamindranath Tagore
 Renuka Devi
 Meera Devi
 Madhurilata Devi
 Satyendranath Tagore
 Surendranath Tagore
 Kabindranath Tagore
 Indira Devi Chaudhurani, m. Pramatha Chaudhuri
 Hemendranath Tagore
 Hitendranath Tagore
 Kshitindranath Tagore 
 Ritendranath Tagore
 Pragyasundari Devi, m. Lakshminath Bezbaroa
 Purnima Devi, m. Sir Jwala Prasada
 Kunwar Jyoti Prasad
 Jitendra Prasada
 Jitin Prasada
 Pratibha Devi
 Abhi Devi 
 Manisha Devi
 Shovana Devi (Shobhanasundari Mukhopadhyay)
 Sushama Devi 
 Sunrita Devi
 Dwijendranath Tagore
 Sudhindranath Tagore
 Saumyendranath Tagore
 Dwipendranath Tagore
 Arunendranath Tagore
 Nitindranath Tagore
 Kritindranath Tagore
 Birendranath Tagore
 Balendranath Tagore
 Jyotirindranath Tagore
 Somendranath Tagore
 Swarnakumari Devi, m. Janakinath Ghosal
 Jyotsnanath Ghosal
 Sarala Devi Chaudhurani, m. Rambhuj Dutt Chaudhari
 Hiranmoyee Devi
 Sukumari Devi, m. Durgadas Choudhary
 Manmatha Nath Chaudhuri
 Devika Rani, m. Himanshu Rai
 Saratkumari Devi
 Barnakumari Devi
 Soudamini Devi
 Nagendranath Tagore

Notes

References
 Deb, Chitra, Jorasanko and the Thakur Family, in Calcutta, the Living City, Vol I, edited by Sukanta Chaudhuri, pp 64–67, Oxford University Press, 
 
 Sengupta, Nitish, "History of the Bengali-speaking People", 2001/2002, UBS Publishers' Distributors Pvt. Ltd., 
 Sengupta, Subodh Chandra and Bose, Anjali (editors), (1976/1998), Sansad Bangali Charitabhidhan (Biographical dictionary) Vol I, in Bengali, Sahitya Sansad 
 Devi Choudhurani, Indira, Smritisamput Vol I (1997/2000), in Bengali, Rabindra Bhaban, Viswa Bharati.
 Tagore, Abanindranath and Chanda, Rani, Jorasankor Dhare (By the side of Jorasanko) in Bengali,(1944/2003), Viswabaharati Publications Division.
 Sastri, Sivanath, Ramtanu Lahiri O Tatkalin Banga Samaj in Bengali, (1903/2001), New Age Publishers Pvt. Ltd.
Dr.S. Radhakrishnan "Rabindranath tagore A Centenary Volume 1861–1961" Sahitya Academy 
Mukherjee, Mani Shankar "Timeless Genius" Pravasi Bharatiya April–May 2010 p 89-90

Further reading

External links
 Tagore family genealogy Queensland University
 Rabindra Bharati Museum, Kolkata – family chronology
 Calcuttaweb – family tree 
 Hindu School, Kolkata

 
Bengal Presidency
People from Kolkata
Family
Indian families
Hindu families
Bengali families
Bengali Hindus